Dong Hengyi (born 25 March 1991), formerly known as Dong Chunyu, is a Chinese footballer who plays as a left-footed goalkeeper for Shenzhen in the Chinese Super League.

Club career
Dong Hengyi started his football career when he played for Shenzhen Jianlibao's and Xiamen Lanshi's youth academies between 2004 and 2007. He moved to Chinese Super League side Guangzhou Pharmaceutical's youth academy in 2008 after Xiamen Lanshi was dissolved and he was promoted to the club's first team in December 2009. He played as backup for Li Shuai during the 2010 league season. The next season, as Yang Jun transferred to the club, Dong became the third-choice goalkeeper within the squad. He moved to the club's youth team Guangzhou Youth to play in the China League Two for the 2011 season. Dong returned to the first team in 2012 and made his debut in the first leg of 2012 Chinese FA Cup semi-finals in which Guangzhou beat Liaoning Whowin 1-0, coming on as a substitute for Li Shuai.

On 23 January 2013, Dong was loaned to China League One side Shenyang Zhongze for the next two seasons. He played sixteen league matches for Shenyang in the 2013 season; however, he became the third-choice goalkeeper in the 2014 season after former teammate Yang Jun joined the club. In July 2014, his loan deal was ended in advance and he returned to Guangzhou. Dong was excludeded from Guangzhou's first team squad in the 2016 season. Dong transferred to China League One side Beijing Enterprises in February 2017. 

On 24 January 2019, Dong transferred to Super League newcomer Wuhan Zall. He would make his debut on 1 March 2019 against Beijing Sinobo Guoan F.C. in a league game that ended in a 1-0 defeat.

International career
Dong received his first call-up to the Chinese under-22 national team in April 2012 and made his debut against Malawi on 9 May 2012.

Personal life
On 14 June 2014, Dong announced on his Weibo that he changed his name from Dong Chunyu to Dong Hengyi.

Career statistics 
.

Honours

Club
Guangzhou Evergrande
Chinese Super League: 2012
Chinese FA Super Cup: 2012
China League One: 2010

References

External links
Player stats at Sodasoccer.com
 

1991 births
Living people
Footballers from Shenyang
Association football goalkeepers
Chinese footballers
Guangzhou F.C. players
Beijing Sport University F.C. players
Wuhan F.C. players
Chinese Super League players
China League One players
China League Two players